TeamUSA – is an organization that represents the American athletes as participants at the World Fly Fishing Championships each year.

Fishing
U.S. Top 20 World Championship Finishes:

 Jeff Currier—Bronze Medalist, Jaca, Spain, 2003
 George M Daniel 5th-place finish, Coimbra, Portugal, 2006
 Lance Egan 6th-place finish, Sudtirol, Italy, 2011
 Norm Maktima 6th-place finish, Slovenia, 2012
 Devin Olsen 11th-place finish, Sudtirol, Italy, 2011
 Pete Erickson 11th-place finish, Slovakia, 2004
 Norm Maktima 12th-place finish Sudtirol, Italy, 2011
 Josh Graffam 13th-place finish, Norway, 2013
 Pete Erickson 13th-place finish, Drymen, Scotland 2009
 Josh Stephens 20th-place finish, New Zealand, 2008
 Cody Burgdorff 14th-place finish, Spain, 2022
 Devin Olsen 18th-place finish, Spain, 2022

* Six "top 10" Team World Championship finishes since 2003

References

External links 
 Fly Fishing Team USA
 fips-mouche

Fly fishing
Fishing in the United States
Fly